Get Yr Blood Sucked Out is an album by Viva Voce, released on September 12, 2006, on Barsuk Records.

Track listing 
 "Believer"
 "When Planets Collide"
 "From the Devil Himself"
 "Drown Them Out"
 "Bill Bixby"
 "So Many Miles"
 "We Do Not Fuck Around"
 "Faster Than a Dead Horse"
 "Special Thing"
 "Never Be Like Yesterday"
 "Helicopter"
 "How to Nurse a Bruised Ego"

References

External links

2006 albums
Viva Voce (band) albums
Barsuk Records albums